Pub Majuli College, established in 1990, is a general degree college situated at Bongaon, in Majuli district, Assam. This college is affiliated with the Dibrugarh University. This college offers bachelor's degree courses in arts.

References

External links
http://pubmajulicollege.org/

Universities and colleges in Assam
Colleges affiliated to Dibrugarh University
Educational institutions established in 1990
1990 establishments in Assam